The Stage Door Betty Handicap was an American Thoroughbred horse race run annually since 2001 at Calder Race Course in Miami Gardens, Florida. Open to Fillies and Mares, age three and older, it is contested on dirt over a distance of  miles (8.5 furlongs).

Run near the end of December, the race has had Grade III status since 2006. It is named for the filly Stage Door Betty to honor her owner, longtime South Florida horsewoman Betty Sessa who died in January 2001.

Along with two other  stakes races, Calder Race Course canceled the 2008 running of the Stage Door Betty Handicap due to what track officials described as "continuing overpayment of purses during the current meet."

Records
Speed record:
 1:44.08 – Stormy Frolic (2002)

Most wins:
 No horse has won this race more than once.

Most wins by a jockey:
 3 – Eibar Coa (2001, 2003, 2006)

Most wins by a trainer:
 No trainer has won this race more than once.

Most wins by an owner:
 No owner has won this race more than once.

Winners

Notes

References
 The Stage Door Betty Handicap at Pedigree Query
 The 2007 Stage Door Betty Handicap at ''Thoroughbred Times

Discontinued horse races
Mile category horse races for fillies and mares
Horse races in Florida
Graded stakes races in the United States
Recurring sporting events established in 2001
Calder Race Course
2001 establishments in Florida
Recurring sporting events disestablished in 2012
2012 disestablishments in Florida